The Lisa Young Quartet is a jazz-world music quartet from Melbourne, Australia, led by a vocal artist and composer Lisa Young.

Background 
The LYQ quartet is composed of Young, Stephen Magnusson (guitar), Ben Robertson (double bass) and Dave Beck (drums). Their most recent work, The Eternal Pulse, is a wordless song-cycle featuring the intoned rhythmic recitation of konnakol, varieties of meter and subdivision, layering Indian elements, rhythmic textures and ensemble dialogue, in an evocative journey of sound and song. The quartet has released four albums, The Eternal Pulse, Grace, Speak and Transformation.

Young is also a founding member of an a cappella group, Coco's Lunch, which has recorded seven albums of original music. In 2003, Coco's Lunch won the award for 'Best Folk/World Song' at the Contemporary A Cappella Recording Awards, in the United States. At the ARIA Music Awards of 2007, Coco's Lunch received nominations in the category 'Best Children's Album' for Rat Trap Snap and in 'Best World Music Album' for Blueprint.

Discography

Albums 

 Transformation (1991)
 Speak (1999)
 Grace (2007)  
 The Eternal Pulse (2012)  
 Grace Special Edition (2014)

Awards

Australian Women in Music Awards
The Australian Women in Music Awards is an annual event that celebrates outstanding women in the Australian Music Industry who have made significant and lasting contributions in their chosen field. They commenced in 2018.

|-
| 2021
| Lisa Young
| Songwriter Award
|

References

External links
 
 Lisa Young On All About Jazz

APRA Award winners
Australian jazz ensembles
Australian world music groups
Musical quartets